Half a Heart may refer to:

 "Half a Heart", a 2002 song by H & Claire from Another You Another Me
 "Half a Heart", a 2006 song by Barenaked Ladies from Barenaked Ladies Are Me
 "Half a Heart", a 2013 song by One Direction from Midnight Memories
 "Half a Heart", a 2015 song by Seal from 7